Nicola Toffali (born 20 October 1992 in Verona) is an Italian racing cyclist. In March 2017  announced that they had signed Toffali.

Major results
2009
 1st Stage 4 3 Giorni Orobica
2010
 1st Piccola Tre Valli Varesine
2012
 3rd Memorial Elia Da Re
2014
 1st Memorial Gianni Biz
 1st Alta Padovana Tour
 1st GP Bianco di Custoza
 1st Coppa San Vito
 4th Coppa Ardigò
 5th Parma-La Spezia
2015
 1st Coppa Collecchio
 1st Memorial Carlo Valentini
 2nd Memorial Denis Zanette e Daniele Del Ben
 5th Memorial Vincenzo Mantovani
 5th Gran Premio Città di Vigonza
2017
 3rd Overall Tour of Iran (Azerbaijan)
 6th Trofeo Matteotti
 6th Circuit de Wallonie
 10th Münsterland Giro

References

1992 births
Italian male cyclists
Living people
Tour of Azerbaijan (Iran) winners
Sportspeople from Verona
Cyclists from the Province of Verona